Román Adrián Fuente González (born 31 January 1985 in Izamal, Yucatán) is a former professional Mexican footballer who last played for Venados on loan from Atlante.

External links

1985 births
Living people
Footballers from Yucatán
Mexican footballers
Indios de Ciudad Juárez footballers
C.F. Mérida footballers
Venados F.C. players

Association footballers not categorized by position
21st-century Mexican people